Josefa Lasagavibau is a Fijian rugby league footballer who represented Fiji in the 2000 World Cup.

Playing career
While playing for the Nadera club in the Fiji National Rugby League Competition, Lasagavibau was selected in the Fijian squad for the 2000 World Cup and played in two matches from the bench, against Russia and England.

In 2010 he joined the Orange Hawks in Australia's Group 10 Rugby League competition. In 2012 he joined the Windsor Wolves in the Bundaberg Red Cup.

References

Living people
Expatriate rugby league players in Australia
Fiji national rugby league team players
Fijian expatriate rugby league players
Fijian expatriates in Australia
Fijian rugby league players
I-Taukei Fijian people
Rugby league halfbacks
Windsor Wolves players
Year of birth missing (living people)